The black caracara (Daptrius ater) is a species of bird of prey in the family Falconidae found in Amazonian and French Guiana lowlands, commonly along rivers. They are locally referred to as Ger' futu busikaka in the Republic of Suriname  or juápipi {nẽjõmbʌ} by the Emberá of Panama and Colombia. Both these names refer to multiple bird species within Falconidae. German-Brazilian ornithologist Helmut Sick also referred to this species as gavião-de-anta, literally translating to "tapir-hawk".

Since migration has not been observed, they are considered sedentary; remaining in the tropics year round. Its genus Daptrius is often considered monotypic today, though some also include its close relative, the red-throated caracara otherwise separated in Ibycter.

Daptrius ater are considered to be a widespread raptor, often spotted in groups of 2-5 individuals in tall trees. Nests built from sticks containing 2-3 spotted, brown eggs have been observed high up in trees, however little else is known about their breeding habits and reproduction. 
Typical of caracaras, this species is an omnivore as well as an opportunistic feeder, known to be both a predator, scavenger and forager.

Taxonomy

The species Daptrius ater was first described by Louis Jean Pierre Vieillot in 1816. It previously shared its genus with the red-throated caracara, which is now known as Ibycter americanus in the monotypic genus Ibycter. The inclusion of I. americanus in the genus Daptrius was made by ornithologist Herbert Friedmann in 1950, and backed up by Dean Amadon in 1968. However, a recent mitochondrial DNA and nuclear sequence data study focusing on caracaras and allies (subfamily Polyborinae) determined that these two species not only differ in genus, but are also arranged in polyphyly, meaning that they do not share a common most recent ancestor. Additionally, it was concluded that D. ater'''s closest relative is the yellow-headed caracara (Milvago chimachima), existing on the phylogenetic tree as a sister group.

 Description 
Adult black caracara are a glossy black except for the distinctive white band on the base of the tail, and yellow to orange-red feet and face. The adults appear similar to those of their closest relative, the red-throated caracara, however they have distinctly long and narrow wings and tail, as well as a black beak. Additionally, the red-throated caracara can be distinguished from the black caracara by their red throats. The average adult length is 41-47cm. The females of this species average 350-440g and are typically larger than the males that have an average weight of 330g. 
Juveniles can be identified by their dull black plumage, pale yellow face and the 3-4 black bars found on the rectrices.

When observing flight from a distance, it is notable that Daptrius ater rarely soars, but instead can be seen continuously flapping.

Habitat and distribution
It is found in Bolivia, Brazil, Colombia, Ecuador, French Guiana, Guyana, Peru, Suriname, and Venezuela. Its natural habitats are subtropical or tropical moist lowland forest and heavily degraded former forest. Common habitats include gallery forest and wooded savanna that are situated between altitudes of 0 to 900m. Black caracara can also be found in mangroves and disturbed forested habitats along water.

Conservation status
IUCN estimates a fluctuating population of 1000-10000 individuals, with an adult population of 670-6700. Population declines have been documented over the past 10 years, however it is not presently considered critical. The designation of least concern is attributed to their large range, ability to survive in fragmented forest, and their diverse diet.

Behavior
The black caracara are most often seen in pairs or family groups of 3-4, but can be spotted alone. They have been observed flying in straight patterns with continuous flapping, walking along rivers, and perching in tall trees. Other common sightings have famously associated them with tapir and capybara, as they have been observed picking ectoparasites from the fur. This interaction can be considered mutualistic as tapirs notably solicit nearby black caracara using a call, then lay still to facilitate tick removal. 
They are also known to scavenge around human settlements and exhibit the ability to fish along rivers.

DietD. ater are known to eat almost anything from vegetation to carrion to live prey; therefore, are best described as an opportunistic feeder.  More specifically, their diet consists of nestlings and fledglings of other bird species, smaller birds such as flycatchers and pigeons, small mammals, carrion, frogs, reptiles, invertebrates, small fish, palm nuts and other fruit.
With this diverse list that makes up their diet, they have developed various foraging and hunting strategies. These include directly attacking the nests of other birds, searching the canopy foliage with their beaks for insects, and exhibiting comfort around humans when scavenging in camps.

Fishing
The diverse list of feeding strategies includes foraging small fish within their riverine habitats. D. ater make use of exposed rocks and emergent vegetation in and along rivers, walking slowly on these surfaces while peering into the water for small fish such as species of Characidae. Once the prey is spotted, they are caught using either the bill or talons then carried away from the river for consumption. Black caracara mostly fish in areas of fast moving rivers where migratory fish are forced to bottleneck and become trapped among plants or within shallow pools, reflecting their opportunistic nature.

Vocalization
This species can also be identified from other species by their harsh, piercing, single note kraaaa'' calls that usually occur during flight. This call is usually repeated several times, often ending in a decrescendo. They do not exhibit diverse vocalizations, restricted to variations in length and volume of their distinctive shriek.

Reproduction
There is only one observational record of a black caracara nest in Brazil being built from twigs 60–70 cm in length, 25m high in a tree. Little else is known about their reproductive behaviors.

References

black caracara
Birds of the Amazon Basin
Birds of Colombia
Birds described in 1816
Taxa named by Louis Jean Pierre Vieillot
Taxonomy articles created by Polbot